Epanastasis enigmatica is a moth in the family Autostichidae. It was described by László Anthony Gozmány in 1964. It is found in Algeria.

References

Moths described in 1964
Epanastasis